Perakian Malay people refers to a group of Malay people originating from the Malaysian state of Perak. As of 2010, it is estimated that the population of the Perakian Malays in Perak are about 55.74% of the state's population.

Language 

Perakian Malays uses a distinct form of Malay variant known as Perak Malay. Linguistically, there are about five Malay dialects  traditionally spoken in Perak, only one of which is intended by the name "Perak Malay" and it can be divided into two sub-dialects namely Perak Tengah sub-dialect and Kuala Kangsar sub-dialect. Other Malay dialects used in Perak include Perak Selatan dialect which is more influenced by Selangor Malay and Perak Ulu Malay dialect (also known as Basa Ulu or Basa Grik) but are not considered as part of Perak Malay as they do not share many similarities with Perak Malay but instead it is linguistically much closer to neighbouring Kelantan-Pattani Malay and other East Coast Malay varieties such as Terengganu Malay and Pahang Malay. Malaysian language is used as a second language and English as a third language.

Culture

Dance
Traditional Perakian Malay dance are such as:-
 Dabus
 Bubu Menari
 Lenggok
 Zapin Gambus
 Belotah
 Sewang

Cuisine
 Ikan Pindang Daun Seniar
 Sambal Serai
 Gulai Kemahang
 Kerabu Umbut Bayas
 Kulat Sisir
 Penjan Ubi

Martial arts
 Silat Serimau Hitam

Notable people
 Abdullah Muhammad Shah II of Perak, the 26th Sultan of Perak and resistor of colonial British Malaya.
 Ahmad Zahid Hamidi, Malaysia's former Deputy Prime Minister.
 Amy Mastura, Malaysian singer and actress.
 Awie, Malaysian singer and actor.
 Fauziah Latiff, Malaysian actress.
 Jamal Abdillah, Malaysian singer and actor.
 Jins Shamsuddin, Malaysian actor and film director.
 Mamat Khalid, Malaysian film director.
 Mohammad Nizar Jamaluddin, politician and former Menteri Besar of Perak.
 Mohd Nasir Basharuddin, Malaysian footballer.
 Ngah Ibrahim, Orang Kaya Mantri of Larut in 1858.
 Mohammad Nor Khalid, a Malaysian cartoonist famously known as Lat
 Nazirul Naim Che Hashim, Malaysian footballer.
 Nurridzuan Abu Hassan, Malaysian footballer.
 Syazwan Roslan, Malaysian footballer.

References

Perak
Malay people
Ethnic groups in Malaysia